The French Navy, informally , is the maritime arm of the French Armed Forces and one of the five military service branches of France. It is among the largest and most powerful naval forces in the world, ranking seventh in combined fleet tonnage and fifth in number of naval vessels. The French Navy is one of eight naval forces currently operating fixed-wing aircraft carriers, with its flagship  being the only nuclear-powered aircraft carrier outside the United States Navy, and one of two non-American vessels to use catapults to launch aircraft.

Founded in the 17th century, the French Navy is one of the oldest navies still in continual service, with precursors dating back to the Middle Ages. It has taken part in key events in French history, including the Napoleonic Wars and both world wars, and played a critical role in establishing and securing the French colonial empire for over 400 years. The French Navy pioneered several innovations in naval technology, including the first steam-powered ship of the line, first seagoing ironclad warship, first mechanically propelled submarine, first steel-hulled warship, and first armoured cruiser.

The French Navy consists of six main components: the Naval Action Force, the Submarine Forces (FOST and ESNA), French Naval Aviation, the Navy Riflemen (including Naval Commandos), the Marseille Naval Fire Battalion, and the Maritime Gendarmerie. As of 2021, the French Navy employed 44,000 personnel (37,000 military and 7,000 civilian), more than 180 ships, 200 aircraft, and six commandos units; as of 2014, its reserve element numbered roughly 48,000.

As a blue-water navy, the French Navy is capable of operating globally and conducting expeditionary missions, maintaining a significant overseas presence. It operates a wide range of fighting vessels, including various aeronaval forces, attack and ballistic missile submarines, frigates, patrol boats and support ships, with aircraft carrier Charles de Gaulle serving as the centerpiece of most expeditionary forces.

Origins 
The history of French naval power dates back to the Middle Ages, and had three loci of evolution:
 The Mediterranean Sea, where the Ordre de Saint-Jean de Jérusalem had its own navy, the Levant Fleet, whose principal ports were Fréjus, Marseille, and Toulon. The Ordre, which was both a religious and military order, recruited knights from the families of French nobility. Members who had fulfilled their service at sea were granted the rank of Knights Hospitaller, elites who served as the officer corps. The Ordre was one of the ancestors of modern French naval schools including the French Naval Academy.
 The Manche along Normandy which, since William the Conqueror, always tendered capable marines and sailors from its numerous active seaports.
 The Atlantic Ocean, where the navy of the Duchy of Brittany eventually constituted the nucleus of the royal Flotte du Ponant, which projected French naval power across the Atlantic and the Americas.

Names and symbols 
The first true French Royal Navy was established in 1624 by Cardinal Richelieu, chief minister to King Louis XIII. During the French Revolution,  was formally renamed . Under the First French Empire and the Second French Empire, the navy was designated as the Imperial French Navy. Institutionally, however, the navy has never lost its short familiar nickname, .

The original symbol of the French Navy was a golden anchor, which, beginning in 1830, was interlaced by a sailing rope; this symbol was featured on all naval vessels, arms, and uniforms. Although anchor symbols are still used on uniforms, a new naval logo was introduced in 1990 under Naval Chief of Staff Bernard Louzeau, featuring a modern design that incorporates the tricolour—by flanking the bow section of a white warship with two ascending red and blue spray foams—and the inscription "".

History

17th century 
Cardinal Richelieu personally supervised the Navy until his death in 1643. He was succeeded by his protégé, Jean Baptiste Colbert, who introduced the first code of regulations of the French Navy and established the original naval dockyards in Brest and Toulon. Colbert and his son, the Marquis de Seignelay, between them administered the Navy for twenty-nine years.

During this century, the Navy cut its teeth in the Anglo-French War (1627–1629), the Franco-Spanish War (1635–59), the Second Anglo-Dutch War, the Franco-Dutch War, and the Nine Years' War. Major battles in these years include the Battle of Augusta, Battle of Beachy Head, the Battles of Barfleur and La Hougue, the Battle of Lagos, and the Battle of Texel.

18th century 

The 1700s opened with the War of the Spanish Succession, over a decade long, followed by the War of the Austrian Succession in the 1740s. Principal engagements of these wars include the Battle of Vigo Bay and two separate Battles of Cape Finisterre in 1747. The most grueling conflict for the Navy, however, was the Seven Years' War, in which it was virtually destroyed. Significant actions include the Battle of Cap-Français, the Battle of Quiberon Bay, and another Battle of Cape Finisterre.

The Navy regrouped and rebuilt, and within 15 years it was eager to join the fray when France intervened in the American Revolutionary War. Though outnumbered everywhere, the French fleets held the British at bay for years until victory. After this conflict and the concomitant Anglo-French War (1778–1783), the Navy emerged at a new height in its history. Major battles in these years include the Battle of the Chesapeake, the Battle of Cape Henry, the Battle of Grenada, the invasion of Dominica, and three separate Battles of Ushant.

Within less than a decade, however, the Navy was decimated by the French Revolution when large numbers of veteran officers were dismissed or executed for their noble lineage. Nonetheless, the Navy fought vigorously through the French Revolutionary Wars as well as the Quasi-War. Significant actions include a fourth Battle of Ushant (known in English as the Glorious First of June), the Battle of Groix, the Atlantic campaign of May 1794, the French expedition to Ireland, the Battle of Tory Island, and the Battle of the Nile.

19th century 

Other engagements of the Revolutionary Wars ensued in the early 1800s, including the Battle of the Malta Convoy and the Algeciras Campaign. The Quasi-War wound down with single-ship actions including USS Constellation vs La Vengeance and USS Enterprise vs Flambeau.

When Napoleon was crowned Emperor in 1804, he attempted to restore the Navy to a position that would enable his plan for an invasion of England. His dreams were dashed by the Battle of Trafalgar in 1805, where the British all but annihilated a combined Franco-Spanish fleet, a disaster that guaranteed British naval superiority throughout the Napoleonic Wars. Still, the Navy did not shrink from action: among the engagements of this time were the Battle of the Basque Roads, the Battle of Grand Port, the Mauritius campaign of 1809–11, and the Battle of Lissa.

After Napoleon's fall in 1815, the long era of Anglo-French rivalry on the seas began to close, and the Navy became more of an instrument for expanding the French colonial empire. Under King Charles X, the two nations' fleets fought side by side in the Battle of Navarino, and throughout the rest of the century they generally behaved in a manner that paved the way for the Entente Cordiale.

Charles X sent a large fleet to execute the invasion of Algiers in 1830. The next year, his successor, Louis Philippe I, made a show of force against Portugal at the Battle of the Tagus, and in 1838 conducted another display of gunboat diplomacy, this time in Mexico at the Battle of Veracruz. Beginning in 1845, a five-year Anglo-French blockade of the Río de la Plata was imposed on Argentina over trade rights.

The Emperor Napoleon III was determined to follow an even stronger foreign policy than his predecessors, and the Navy was involved in a multitude of actions around the world. He joined in the Crimean War in 1854; major actions for the Navy include the siege of Petropavlovsk and the Battle of Kinburn. The Navy was heavily involved in the Cochinchina Campaign in 1858, the Second Opium War in China, and the French intervention in Mexico. It took part in the French campaign against Korea, and fought Japan in the bombardment of Shimonoseki. In the Franco-Prussian War in 1870, the Navy imposed an effective blockade of Germany, but events on land proceeded at such a rapid pace that it was superfluous. Isolated engagements between French and German ships took place in other theaters, but the war was over in a matter of weeks.

The Navy continued to protect colonial safety and expansion under the French Third Republic. The Sino-French War saw considerable naval action including the Battle of Fuzhou, the Battle of Shipu, and the Pescadores Campaign. In Vietnam, the Navy helped wage the Tonkin Campaign which included the Battle of Thuận An, and it later participated in the Franco-Siamese War of 1893.

The 19th century French Navy brought forth numerous new technologies. It led the development of naval artillery with its invention of the highly effective Paixhans gun. In 1850,  became the first steam-powered ship of the line in history, and  became the first seagoing ironclad warship nine years later. In 1863, the Navy launched , the first submarine in the world to be propelled by mechanical power. In 1876,  became the first steel-hulled warship ever. In 1887,  became the world's first armoured cruiser.

During the latter part of the century, French officers developed the so-called Jeune École (Young School) theory that emphasized the use of small, cheap torpedo boats to destroy expensive battleships, coupled with long-range commerce raiders to attack an opponent's merchant fleet.

20th century

The first seaplane, the French Fabre Hydravion, was flown in 1910, and the first seaplane carrier, was christened in the following year. Despite that innovation, the general development of the French Navy slowed down in the beginning of the 20th century as the naval arms race between Germany and Great Britain grew in intensity. It entered World War I with relatively few modern vessels, and during the war few warships were built because the main French effort was on land. While the British held control of the North Sea, the French held the Mediterranean, where they mostly kept watch on the Austro-Hungarian Navy. The largest operations of the Navy were conducted during the Dardanelles Campaign. In December 1916, during the Noemvriana events, French warships also bombarded Athens, trying to force the pro-German government of Greece to change its policies. The French Navy also played an important role in countering Germany's U-boat campaign by regularly patrolling the seas and escorting convoys.

Between the World Wars, the Navy modernized and expanded significantly, even in the face of limitations set by the 1922 Washington Naval Treaty. New additions included the heavy and fast  "super-destroyers", the  battleships, and the submarine  which was the largest and most powerful of its day.

From the start of World War II, the Navy was involved in a number of operations, participating in the Battle of the Atlantic, the Norwegian Campaign, the Dunkirk evacuation and, briefly, the Battle of the Mediterranean. However, after the fall of France in June 1940, the Navy was obligated to remain neutral under the terms of the armistice that created the truncated state of Vichy France. Worldwide, some 100 naval vessels and their crews heeded General Charles de Gaulle's call to join forces with the British, but the bulk of the fleet, including all its capital ships, transferred loyalty to Vichy. Concerned that the German Navy might somehow gain control of the ships, the British mounted an attack on Mers-el-Kébir, the Algerian city where many of them were harbored. The incident poisoned Anglo-French relations, leading to Vichy reprisals and a full-scale naval battle at Casablanca in 1942 when the Allies invaded French North Africa. But the confrontations were set aside once the Germans occupied Vichy France. The capital ships were a primary goal of the occupation, but before they could be seized they were scuttled by their own crews. A few small ships and submarines managed to escape in time, and these joined de Gaulle's Free French Naval Forces, an arm of Free France that fought as an adjunct of the Royal Navy until the end of the war. In the Pacific theatre as well, Free French vessels operated until the Japanese capitulation;  was present at the Japanese Instrument of Surrender.

The Navy later provided fire support and troop transport in the Indochina War, the Algerian War, the Gulf War, and the Kosovo War.

21st century 

Since 2000, the Navy has given logistical support to the War in Afghanistan (2001–2021) as well as the global War on Terror. In 2011, it assisted Opération Harmattan in Libya.

Organisation

The chief of the naval staff is Vice-admiral d’escadre Arnaud de Tarlé, and as of 2014 the Navy has an active strength of 36,776 military personnel and 2,909 civilian staff. The Navy is organised into four main operational branches:
 The Force d'Action Navale (Naval Action Force) – Surface fleet.
 The Forces Sous-marines (Submarine forces) – Nuclear-powered ballistic missile submarines and fleet submarines.
 The Aviation Navale (Naval air force) – Ground and sea-based aircraft.
 The Fusiliers Marins (Naval riflemen) – Protection force and infantry including the Navy special forces (Commandos Marine).

In addition, the National Gendarmerie of France maintain a maritime force of patrol boats that falls under the operational command of the French Navy:
 The Gendarmerie maritime – The coast guard of France.

During most of the Cold War, the Navy was organised in two squadrons based in Brest and Toulon, commanded by ALESCLANT (Amiral commandant l'escadre de l'Atlantique) and ALESCMED (Amiral commandant l'escadre de la Méditerranée) respectively. Since the post-Cold War restructuring process named Optimar '95, the two components have been divided into the Naval Action Force (commanded by ALFAN) and the Antisubmarine Group (commanded by ALGASM).

Main naval bases
As of 2014, the largest French naval base is the military port of Toulon. Other major bases in metropolitan France are the Brest Arsenal and Île Longue on the Atlantic, and Cherbourg Naval Base on the English Channel. Overseas French bases include Fort de France and Degrad des Cannes in the Americas; Port des Galets and Dzaoudzi in the Indian Ocean; and Nouméa and Papeete in the Pacific. In addition, the navy shares or leases bases in foreign locales such as Abu Dhabi, Dakar and Djibouti.

Equipment

Ships and submarines

Although French naval doctrine calls for two aircraft carriers, the French only have one, . Originally a planned order for French aircraft carrier PA2 was based on the design of the British  recently constructed and launched for the British Royal Navy. However, the French programme had been delayed several times for budgetary reasons and the result was priority being given to the more exportable FREMM project. In April 2013 it was confirmed that the second aircraft carrier project would be abandoned due to defence cuts announced in the 2013 French White Paper on Defence and National Security.

The French Navy operates three amphibious assault ships, ten air defence and/or anti-submarine frigates, five general purpose frigates and has a commitment to six fleet submarines (SSNs). These vessels, with the aircraft carrier Charles de Gaulle, constitute the French Navy's main ocean-going war-fighting force, while the four ballistic missile submarines (SSBN) of the navy's Strategic Oceanic Force provide the backbone of the French nuclear deterrent.

In addition the French Navy operates six light surveillance frigates and, as of 2020, six avisos (originally light corvettes now reclassified as patrol vessels). They undertake the navy's offshore patrol duties, the protection of French naval bases and territorial waters, and can also provide low-end escort capabilities to any oceangoing task force. The Navy also operates a fleet of offshore and coastal patrol vessels, mine countermeasures vessels as well as auxiliaries and support ships.

Aircraft

The French Naval Aviation is officially known as the Aéronautique navale and was created on the 19 June 1998 with the merging of Naval patrol aircraft and aircraft carrier squadrons. It has a strength of around 6,800 civilian and military personnel operating from four airbases in Metropolitan France. The Aéronavale has been modernized with 40 Rafale fighters which operate from the aircraft carrier Charles de Gaulle.

Personnel
{|align=right class="wikitable"
|colspan=3 style="text-align:center;" |Personnel strength of the French Navy 2015
|-
! align="left" width="100" | Category
! align="left" width="50" | Strength
|-
| Commissioned officers || 4,500
|-
| Petty officers || 23,600
|-
|Seamen|| 6,600
|-
|Volunteers|| 767
|-
| Civilian employees || 2,800
|-
|colspan=2|Source:
|}

 Application requirement 
Seamen
Seamen must be at least 17 but no more than 30 years old, with no minimum level of schooling.

Petty Officers
Petty officers must be at least 17 but no more than 30 years old, with at least a high school diploma giving access to university studies.

Petty Officer Candidate begin training with five months at the Petty Officer School of Maistrance at Brest.

Contract officers
Contract officers serve on an initial eight-year contract, renewable up to 20 years.
 Operational officers must be 21 to 26 years old, with at least a Bachelor of Science degree, or having passed a classe préparatoire aux grandes écoles in engineering or business.
 Staff officers have to be 21 to 29 years old, with an honors degree or master's degree in a field corresponding to the military occupational specialty.

Career officers
 Less than 22 years old, having passed a classe préparatoire in science. After four years at the École Navale (naval academy) a cadet will graduate as a commissioned Enseigne de Vaisseau with an engineering degree.
 Less than 25 years old, having an honors degree in science. After three years at the naval academy a cadet will graduate as Enseigne de Vaisseau with an engineering degree.
 Less than 27 years old, having a master's degree. After two years at the naval academy a cadet will graduate as an Enseigne de Vaisseau.

Customs and traditions

Ranks

The rank insignia of the French Navy are worn on shoulder straps of shirts and white jackets, and on sleeves for navy jackets and mantels. Until 2005, only commissioned officers had an anchor on their insignia, but enlisted personnel are now receiving them as well. Commanding officers have titles of capitaine, but are called commandant (in the army, both capitaine and commandant are ranks, which tends to stir some confusion among the public). The two highest ranks, vice-amiral d'escadre and amiral (admiral), are functions, rather than ranks. They are assumed by officers ranking vice-amiral (vice admiral). The only amiral de la flotte (Admiral of the Fleet) was François Darlan after he was refused the dignity of amiral de France (Admiral of France). Equivalent to the dignity of Marshal of France, the rank of amiral de France remains theoretical in the Fifth Republic; it was last granted in 1869, during the Second Empire, but retained during the Third Republic until the death of its bearer in 1873. The title of amiral de la flotte was created so that Darlan would not have an inferior rank than his counterpart in the British Royal Navy, who had the rank of Admiral of the Fleet.

Commissioned officer ranks
The rank insignia of commissioned officers.

Other ranks
The rank insignia of non-commissioned officers and enlisted personnel.

Addressing officers
Unlike in the French Army and air and space force, one does not prepend mon to the name of the rank when addressing an officer (that is, not mon capitaine, but simply capitaine).

Uniforms

Military music

The main military musical unit of the French Navy is the Military Band of the Toulon Fleet, founded on 13 July 1827. The Bagad Lann Bihoue, based on the bagad bands in Bretagne, is currently the sole pipe band in the service of the French Navy, which uses bagpipes and bombards, and thus is affiliated to the band.

In Canada, French naval music has affected the traditions of Canadian navy bands. French navy bands in the country date back to the era of New France. Musical units were primarily attached to the Compagnies Franches de la Marine and the Troupes de la marine, the former of which maintained two drums (tambour) and a fife.

Future

France's financial problems have affected all branches of her military. The 2013 French White Paper on Defence and National Security cancelled the long-planned new aircraft carrier and a possible fourth . DCNS has shown a FREMM-ER concept to meet this requirement, emphasising ballistic missile defence with the Thales Sea Fire 500 AESA radar. Industrial considerations mean that the funds for FREMMs 9-11 will now be spent on five more exportable frégates de taille intermédiaire (FTI, "intermediate size frigates") from 2024 to supplement, and ultimately replace, the La Fayette class, three of which are being upgraded with new sonars to operate into the early 2030s. With respect to support ships, the  will be replaced under the FLOTLOG project by four derivatives of Italy's , to be delivered in 2023–2029.

Construction has started on the first of six Barracuda-class nuclear attack submarines; commissioning of Suffren took place in 2020. These nuclear attack submarines are to be followed in the 2030s by the incremental introduction of a new class of nuclear-powered ballistic missile submarines (SSBNs) whose construction is to begin in around 2023.

The first MM40 Exocet Block 3 missile was test-fired in 2010 to be produced. Naval versions of the SCALP EG land-attack cruise missile are under development, along with a planned Aster Block 1NT with greater capabilities against ballistic missiles.

In October 2018, the French Ministry of Defence launched an 18-month study for €40 million for the eventual future replacement of the aircraft carrier Charles de Gaulle beyond 2030. A decision to build the new carrier was taken by President Emmanuel Macron in 2020 and once it enters service it is anticipated to remain in service until beyond 2080. Construction of the new carrier is to begin in around 2025 with service entry anticipated in the latter 2030s.

French naval officers
Privateers
 Lieutenant général des Armées navales du Casse
 Lieutenant général des Armées navales Duguay-Trouin
 Chef d'escadre Jean Bart
 Chef d'escadre Pierre Bouvet
 Cassard
 Surcouf
 Thurot

Heroes of the First Republic
 Vice-admiral de Latouche-Tréville
 Vice-admiral de Villaret-Joyeuse
 Vice-admiral Bruix
 Rear Admiral du Chayla
 Capitaine de vaisseau du Petit Thouars
 Capitaine de vaisseau Casabianca

Explorers
 Lieutenant général des Armées navales Bougainville
 Chef d'escadre d'Entrecasteaux
 Chef d'escadre Dumont d'Urville
 Chef de Division Lapérouse
 Captain Samuel de Champlain
 Captain d'Iberville
 Captain Nicolas Baudin
 Captain Louis de Freycinet
 Commander Doudart de Lagrée
 Lieutenant de St Aloüarn
 Lieutenant Francis Garnier
 Lieutenant Savorgnan de Brazza

Other important French naval officers
 Admiral Florent de Varennes—first admiral of France
 Admiral Jean de Vienne—admiral of the French fleet during the Hundred Years' War
 Admiral Hervé de Portzmoguer— Breton naval commander, renowned for his raids on the English and his death in the Battle of St. Mathieu
 Admiral d'Estaing—admiral of the French fleet which helped the United States secure independence
 Admiral de Grasse—commander of the French fleet at Chesapeake Bay during the American Revolutionary War.
 Admiral Courbet-commander of the Far East Squadron.
 Vice-Admiral Tourville—commander of the French fleet at the Battle of Beachy Head
 Vice-Admiral Villeneuve—commander of the French and Spanish fleets at the Battle of Trafalgar
 Vice-Admiral Duquesne—commander of the French fleet at the Battle of Agosta
 Lieutenant commander Paul Teste, pioneer of the modern aeronaval operations.
 Vice-Admiral Jean-Paul de Saumeur, often called Chevalier Paul, served in several Mediterranean campaigns.

Notable people who served in the French Navy
 Marcel Cerdan, world boxing champion during the 1940s
 Jean Cocteau, poet, novelist, dramatist, designer, playwright, artist and filmmaker
 Jean Cras, composer
 Jacques-Yves Cousteau
 Philippe de Gaulle, the son of the general Charles de Gaulle
 Alain Delon, actor, served as a fusilier marin in the First Indochina War
 Bob Denard, a mercenary notorious for coup attempts and wars in Africa
 Jean Gabin, another major French actor, he joined the free French naval force during the Second World War
 Paul Gauguin, painter, sculptor, print-maker, ceramist, and writer
 Bernard Giraudeau, actor, film director, scriptwriter, producer and writer
 André Marty, a leading figure in the French Communist Party from 1923 to 1955
 Albert II, Prince of Monaco, reserve Lieutenant Commander
 Pierre Loti, mostly known for his literary works
 Albert Roussel, composer
 Michel Serres, philosopher and author
 Eric Tabarly, yachtsman
 Victor Segalen, ethnographer, archaeologist, writer, poet, explorer, art-theorist, linguist and literary critic
 Eugène Sue, a famous 19th-century novelist
 Paul Emile Victor, an ethnologist and polar explorer

See also

 Future of the French Navy
 List of active French Navy ships
 List of French Navy ship names

Marine Nationale
 Airborne Units of the French Navy
 Escorteur
 Far East Squadron
 French 100 mm naval gun
 List of aircraft carriers of France
 List of Escorteurs of the French Navy
 List of French naval battles
 List of Naval Ministers of France
 Standing French Navy Deployments
 :Category:French Navy admirals
 :Category:French Navy officers
 :Category:Naval ships of France

Notes

References

Further reading
 
 
 Winfield, Rif and Roberts, Stephen S., French Warships in the Age of Sail, 1626-1786: Design, Constructions, Careers and Fates (Seaforth Publishing, 2017) ; French Warships in the Age of Sail, 1786-1861: Design, Constructions, Careers and Fates'' (Seaforth Publishing, 2015) .

External links

  Marine nationale—Official site
  French Navy 2011—Guide Book
  French Navy 2011—Information File
  Net-Marine—A well documented database on French navy.
  Mer & Marine—Main website on French maritime affairs (only in French)
  French Fleet Air Arm, about French naval aviation.
  French Navy in World War 1, including warship losses

 
Military of France